The Bicycle Thief or Bicycle Thieves may refer to: 

The Bicycle Thief (band), American alternative rock band
"The Bicycle Thief" (Modern Family), episode of the television series Modern Family
Bicycle Thieves, also known as The Bicycle Thief, 1948 film directed by Vittorio De Sica
 Bicycle Thieves (2013 film), Indian Malayalam film

See also
Bicycle theft